Sutermeister is a comparatively rare Swiss German/Swabian surname, found in Zofingen and Schöftland.

Arnold Sutermeister of Zofingen emigrated to the United States in 1846, establishing the surname as Swiss-American.

People called Sutermeister

Sutermeister-Moehrlen-Muhlberg family

Other Sutermeisters
 Arnold Sutermeister (1830–1907), captain in the American Civil War, father of Robert A. Sutermeister
 Carlo Sutermeister (1847–1918), Swiss engineer and timber business man
 Margaret Sutermeister (1875–1950), American photographer, sister of Edwin Sutermeister
 Edwin Sutermeister (1876–1958), American chemist, brother of Margaret Sutermeister
 Guido Sutermeister (1883–1966), Italian archaeologist and engineer of Swiss origin
 John Rudolph Sutermeister (1803–1826), American jurist and poet
 Robert A. Sutermeister (1913–2008), American economist, son of Arnold Sutermeister
 Rudolf Sutermeister (1802–1868), Swiss doctor
 Helen Sutermeister (1943 or 1944 – 1979), archaeologist

References

External links
Steven A. Sutermeister: Sutermeister Family Register. In Association with Robert A. Sutermeister and Robert L. Sutermeister.  1987 Edition, in the Swiss National Library

Swiss families
Swiss diaspora